Ptyssoptera tetropa is a moth of the family Palaephatidae. It is found in the Australian states of New South Wales and South Australia.

References

Moths described in 1893
Palaephatidae